Gizem is a common feminine Turkish given name. In Turkish, "Gizem" means "Mystery", and/or "Enigma". Pronunciation is "GI-ZEM," with a hard "g" (as in "gift") and emphasis on the second syllable.

People
 Gizem Bozkurt (born 1993), Turkish swimmer
 Gizem Çam (born 1991), Turkish swimmer
 Gizem Giraygil (born 1986), Turkish volleyball player
 Gizem Girişmen (born 1981), Turkish archer
 Gizem Gönültaş (born 1993), Turkish footballer
 Gizem Güreşen (born 1987), Turkish volleyball player
 Gizem Karaca (born 1992), Turkish actress
 Gizem Memiç (born 1990), Miss Turkey
 Gizem Öztaşdelen (born 1992), Turkish ice hockey player
 Hatice Gizem Örge (born 1993), Turkish volleyball player

Turkish feminine given names